Lamb is a 1985 Irish drama film, directed by Colin Gregg and starring Liam Neeson, Hugh O'Conor and Ian Bannen. The film is based on the novel by Bernard MacLaverty, who also wrote the screenplay. It was released in Ireland on 10 October 1986.

Plot
Lamb tells the story of a young Christian Brother, Brother Sebastian, who works in a Roman Catholic institution for troubled boys on the west coast of Ireland, referred to as "a finishing school for the sons of the Idle Poor" by its head, Brother Benedict. There, the Brothers teach boys to conform in a harsh, uncompromising regime which Brother Sebastian, whose real name is Michael Lamb, finds deeply distasteful. The Brothers teach the boys "a little of God and a lot of fear."

When his father dies, leaving him a small legacy, the tie which kept him at the home is gone and he decides to leave and take Owen Kane, a bullied, unhappy 10-year-old boy with him. His decision is also affected by the fact that he has made a vow of poverty and Brother Benedict expects him to hand his inheritance over to the Brothers.

Michael has formed an attachment to Owen. He is the youngest boy there and has been in the home for two years. Brother Benedict beats him for painting graffiti on the wall outside, because it ends with the word OK – Owen's initials – despite knowing that it was not Owen who did it. Owen comes from a broken family and a drunken, abusive father. Michael cannot see how he will survive there and wishes to give him his freedom.

He secretly leaves the school and takes Owen with him to London hoping to be the boy's saviour, although he knows he is committing a criminal act. They pass themselves off as father and son and move from hotel to hotel. Michael lets Owen smoke, play on gaming machines and takes him to a football match to see his favourite team Arsenal play, but Owen, an epileptic, has a fit. They have to slip away from the medical centre before questions are asked.

Owen sometimes prattles on and on and sometimes just sits silently. Michael feels embarrassed during the silences and recognises that Owen controls the communication between them. As the days and weeks go by, Michael became more comfortable with the silences and they laugh a lot.

As his money dwindles and news of the kidnapping reaches the English community, with Owen's picture in the newspaper, Michael finds himself running out of ideas on how to save the boy's life. About to fly back to Ireland, they come across an ex-army man called Haddock who tells them about a nearby squat and says they can move in. Michael returns to the hotel to find Owen in floods of tears, thinking Michael has left him. In an emotional scene, Michael tells Owen he loves him and man and boy hug and hold each other tight.

Michael gets a job, leaving Owen at the squat, but returns to find that Haddock, who he knows is gay, is in his dressing gown, has his arm around the boy's shoulders and has been letting Owen smoke pot. Michael is worried Haddock may have molested the boy, or will try to, and decides they have to leave.

Determined to save Owen from being forced to return to the home, but realizing he cannot look after the boy himself because of the frequency of the seizures and his inability to monitor them, Michael drowns him in the sea during Owen's next seizure, after hearing him describe the experience of a seizure as a form of joy. The drowning is portrayed as a baptism as Michael calls out to God while holding Owen under the water. Having murdered the boy, Michael tries to drown himself, but is unable to. The movie ends with the sun setting, Owens body laying on the sand and Michael hugging his knees and looking off in deep thought.

Cast
 Liam Neeson as Michael Lamb
 Harry Towb as Priest  
 Hugh O'Conor as Owen Kane  
 Frances Tomelty as Mrs. Kane  
 Ian Bannen as Brother Benedict  
 Ronan Wilmot as Brother Fintan  
 Denis Carey as Mr. Lamb  
 David Gorry as O'Donnell  
 Andrew Pickering as Murphy  
 Stuart O'Connor as O'Holloran  
 Ian McElhinney as Maguire
 Dudley Sutton as Haddock
 Nigel Humphreys as Policeman
 Eileen Kennally as Neighbour Woman
 Lorna Ellis as Shy Girl

See also
 Congregation of Christian Brothers

References

External links 
 
Holden, Stephen. A Misguided Attempt at Fatherhood, The New York Times, 24 February 1995.

1985 films
English-language Irish films
Irish drama films
1985 drama films
1980s English-language films